Xanthine dehydrogenase, also known as XDH, is a protein that, in humans, is encoded by the XDH gene.

Function 

Xanthine dehydrogenase belongs to the group of molybdenum-containing hydroxylases involved in the oxidative metabolism of purines. The enzyme is a homodimer. Xanthine dehydrogenase can be converted to xanthine oxidase by reversible sulfhydryl oxidation or by irreversible proteolytic modification.

Xanthine dehydrogenase catalyzes the following chemical reaction:

xanthine + NAD+ + H2O  urate + NADH + H+

The three substrates of this enzyme are xanthine, NAD+, and H2O, whereas its three products are urate, NADH, and H+.

This enzyme participates in purine metabolism.

Nomenclature 

This enzyme belongs to the family of oxidoreductases, to be specific, those acting on CH or CH2 groups with NAD+ or NADP+ as acceptor. The systematic name of this enzyme class is xanthine:NAD+ oxidoreductase. Other names in common use include NAD+-xanthine dehydrogenase, xanthine-NAD+ oxidoreductase, xanthine/NAD+ oxidoreductase, and xanthine oxidoreductase.

Clinical significance
Defects in xanthine dehydrogenase cause xanthinuria, may contribute to adult respiratory stress syndrome, and may potentiate influenza infection through an oxygen metabolite-dependent mechanism. It has been shown that patients with  lung adenocarcinoma tumors which have high levels of XDH gene expression have lower survivals. Addiction to XDH protein has been used to target NSCLC tumors and cell lines in a precision oncology manner.

See also 

 Aldehyde oxidase and xanthine dehydrogenase, a/b hammerhead domain
 MOCOS
 Xanthine oxidase

References

Further reading

External links 
 

EC 1.17.1
EC 1.17.3
NADH-dependent enzymes
Enzymes of known structure
Molybdenum enzymes
Metalloproteins
Genes on human chromosome 2